Dr. George Rigas House is a historic home located at Weirton, Hancock County, West Virginia. It was built in 1936, and is a five-bay, -story wood-frame house with clapboard siding and a side gable roof.  It has an eclectic style.  It features a gable-roofed portico centered on the main elevation and  supported by four Tuscan order columns and two pilasters. The house is associated with Dr. George S. Rigas, a prominent local physician who practiced medicine in Weirton.

It was listed on the National Register of Historic Places in 2004.

References

Houses on the National Register of Historic Places in West Virginia
Houses completed in 1936
Houses in Hancock County, West Virginia
National Register of Historic Places in Hancock County, West Virginia